Dimitris Nalitzis (born 25 January 1976) is a Greek former professional footballer who played as a centre forward. He is the current team manager of AEK Athens.

Over the course of 11 seasons (17 overall) he amassed Superleague Greece totals of 230 games and 55 goals in representation of five teams, mainly Panionios.

Club career
Nalitzis was born in Piraeus. After starting professionally with Panionios FC, making his Superleague Greece debuts at only 17 and remaining with the club for six seasons, five spent in the top level, his career never really settled, as he went on to represent more than ten teams during more than one decade: until June 2003 he played for Ethnikos Asteras FC, PAOK FC and Udinese Calcio (for which he never appeared officially and who also loaned him three times for the duration of his contract, at Perugia Calcio, Sporting Clube de Portugal and AEK Athens.

After his release from the Italians Nalitzis moved permanently to AEK, but only scored twice in one full season, moving on to the Greek lower leagues, successively with PAE Kerkyra, Panionios – the only two top flight exceptions – Ethnikos Asteras, Ethnikos Piraeus F.C. and Fostiras FC. He also had another unassuming abroad experience, now in Cyprus with AEP Paphos FC, scoring his only league goal as an import during his career.

Nalitzis retired in June 2010, at the age of 34.

International career
Nalitzis made six appearances for Greece, during roughly three years. His debut came on 26 April 2000, in a 1–0 friendly win over the Republic of Ireland in Dublin.

Honours

Club
Panionios
Greek Football Cup: 1997–98

PAOK
Greek Football Cup: 2000–01

Sporting
Primeira Liga: 2001–02
Taça de Portugal: 2001–02

Individual
Superleague Greece: Top Scorer 1999–2000

References

External links

1976 births
Living people
Footballers from Piraeus
Greek footballers
Association football forwards
Super League Greece players
Football League (Greece) players
Panionios F.C. players
Ethnikos Asteras F.C. players
PAOK FC players
AEK Athens F.C. players
A.O. Kerkyra players
Ethnikos Piraeus F.C. players
Serie A players
Udinese Calcio players
A.C. Perugia Calcio players
Primeira Liga players
Sporting CP footballers
Fostiras F.C. players
Cypriot First Division players
AEP Paphos FC players
Greece international footballers
Greek expatriate footballers
Expatriate footballers in Italy
Expatriate footballers in Portugal
Expatriate footballers in Cyprus
Greek expatriate sportspeople in Portugal